This is a list of fictional characters from comic books and other media who are or have been enemies of the Blue Beetle.

Dan Garret (Fox Syndicate)
In chronological order (with issue and date of first appearance):

Dan Garrett (Charlton) 
In chronological order (with issue and date of first appearance):

Ted Kord
In chronological order (with issue and date of first appearance):

Jaime Reyes 
In chronological order (with issue and date of first appearance):

References

Lists of DC Comics characters
Lists of DC Comics supervillains
Lists of villains
Blue Beetle